Joseph Wallace Carter (11 June 1898 – 7 July 1970) was an Australian rules footballer who played with Melbourne in the Victorian Football League (VFL).

Notes

External links 

1898 births
1970 deaths
Australian rules footballers from Melbourne
Melbourne Football Club players
People from Brunswick, Victoria